I Tell a Fly is the second album by English artist and poet Benjamin Clementine. It follows his Mercury Prize-winning debut album, At Least for Now. According to a press release, the album was written and produced by Clementine, recorded at RAK Studios, Abbey Road Studios and Studio 13. It was released on 29 September 2017 in Europe and 2 October in the United States.

Critical reception

I Tell a Fly was well-received by contemporary music critics upon its initial release. At Metacritic, which assigns a normalised rating out of 100 to reviews from music critics, the album received a universal acclaim score of 81 based on 12 reviews.

In the review for AllMusic, Timothy Monger described the album as being "Meticulously packed with lead and backing vocals in a variety of timbres, songs like the warbling harpsichord-ornamented "Better Sorry Than a Safe" and the sprawling and kooky refugee crisis commentary "Phantom of Aleppoville" show an intense artist operating at a full sprint down the crooked ginnels of his imagination." Andy Gill, writing a review for The Independent regarded the music as classical and avant-garde with operatic delivery, pointing out that, I Tell A Fly won’t be to everyone’s taste--which in this era of increasing conformity may be its most valuable asset. Writing for The Skinny, Aiden Ryan noted that Clementine sounded wholly original. On I Tell a Fly, he offers stunning, stirring proof that his originality extends beyond his voice to his phrasing on every instrument he touches – piano, but also here, showcased to great effect, harpsichord and clavichord – as well as to arrangements and production. All of which conspires to pummel and purge every tired expectation that repetitive rap, rock, dance, pop, indie, and alternative music have wrought into us. Appropriately, the album opens with Farewell Sonata. Simon Price from Q Magazine stated "Anyone expecting an album of unchallenging fodder is in for a shock. Like the voyage faced by its desperate, stateless subjects, I Tell A Fly is no easy ride."

In a less enthusiastic review for The Guardian, Alexis Petridis said that Clementine clearly has things to say about some important topics, and it’s hard not to think they might reach a wider audience if they were a little less obliquely presented. Equally, there’s something laudable about an artist using their initial success not as a foundation for steady commercial growth but as leverage to get something like I Tell a Fly released and promoted by a major label.

Track listing

Personnel
Benjamin Clementine – music, production, artwork
Alexis Bossard – drums
Steve Sedgwick – recording engineer and mixer
John Davis – mastering engineer
Max Anstruther – recording engineer 
Wes Maebe – recording engineer
Robbie Nelson – recording engineer
Duncan Fuller – assistant recording engineer
Craig Mcdean – photography 
Akatre – design

Charts

References

2017 albums
Benjamin Clementine albums
Virgin EMI Records albums